Zukve is a village in Serbia. It is situated in the Koceljeva municipality, in the Mačva District of Central Serbia. In 2002 the village had 262 inhabitants, all of whom were Serbian.

Historical population

1948: 482
1953: 487
1961: 464
1971: 409
1981: 334
1991: 270
2002: 262
Also, near Zadar, Croatia, there is tourist village Zukve.

References

See also
List of places in Serbia

Populated places in Mačva District